Pronematus pruni is a species of mite belonging to the family Tydeidae. This small oval mite is around 300 μm in length with a smooth body and legs much shorter than the body. It has been recorded on Prunus domestica and Psidium guajava in the vicinity of Potchefstroom, South Africa.

References
New species of mites of the families Tydeidae and Labidostommidae (Acarina: Prostigmata) collected from South African plants Magdelena K.P. Meyer & P.A.J. Ryke Acarologia vol I

Trombidiformes
Animals described in 1959
Arachnids of Africa